Hermosa, officially the Municipality of Hermosa,  is a 1st class municipality in the province of Bataan, Philippines. According to the 2020 census, it has a population of 77,443 people.

"Hermosa" means "beautiful" in Spanish.

Hermosa is home to the Roosevelt Protected Landscape and is accessible via the Bataan Provincial Expressway, off Exit 10 and Jose Abad Santos Avenue.

Etymology
According to legend, a group of Spaniards first came to this place, surprised and amazed they exclaimed, Que Hermosa! Que Hermosa!, when they saw some pretty maidens with long, black hair washing clothes and bathing in the brook. The boys who accompanied their sisters repeated what they heard from the Spaniards and upon returning home they repeated again and again what the Spaniards exclaimed. When the next group of Spaniards visited the place, they asked for its name. The folks didn't understand Spanish but answered "Hermosa, Hermosa". And that was how Hermosa got its name.

Another version was that "Llana Hermosa", meaning beautiful plain of white flowers was the original name of this town. When the province was created, the town was formally named Hermosa, a name that fits the place not only due to the plain's white flowers but more so to the beautiful maidens and places that abound the town.

History
Historically, the town was established in 1756 by Dominican priests. At that time, it was known as Llana Hermosa and composed of Mabuco and Mabuyan. It was then still part of Pampanga, like the rest of Bataan. It became an independent missionary center in 1756 with Saint Peter de Verona as its patron saint.

The town of Hermosa was very peaceful and progressive before World War II. When the war broke out, their quiet routine was disturbed. During the Bataan Death March, civilians of Hermosa risked the ire of the Japanese by secretly passing food to Filipino and American soldiers.

Geography
Hermosa is located directly south of Dinalupihan and south-southwest of San Fernando, Pampanga (the regional city center). Hermosa borders the province of the Pampanga to the northeast, with Manila Bay to the east.

According to the Philippine Statistics Authority, the municipality has a land area of  constituting  of the  total area of Bataan.

Climate

Barangays
Hermosa is politically subdivided into 23 barangays.

Demographics

In the 2020 census, Hermosa had a population of 77,443.

Economy 

Existing industries in Hermosa are garments, handpainted jars, balut and salted egg making. Today, fruit processing particularly of mangoes and bananas, handicrafts, and stuffed toys are the major produce of this town. Probably less known, but existing for a long time is the aquaculture industry, traditionally for bangus, tilapia and crabs, but more recently for prawns, which was found more lucrative.

Hermosa Rural Bank serves the banking needs of the municipality. Major bus lines and mini-bus coming from Manila, San Fernando and Olongapo pass through the town of Hermosa while the most common type of transport within the municipality are jeepneys and tricycles. The newly established Hermosa Public Market in barangay Palihan has also the terminal of vehicles going to Clark and Mabalacat in Pampanga via SCTEX. The town has a total of 1 bank, 21 schools, 15 medical clinics/health centers, and 2 recreational facilities.

Hermosa Special Economic Zone
The Zone is adapted for building light to medium industries, recreational and housing facilities for industry and residents inside the zone investments in fruit processing utilizing the abundant supply of mangoes and banana in the province. The Subic Hermosa Cybercity is a 93-hectare Special Economic Zone which will host locator Businesses dealing in Information Technology (IT), manufacture of electronic products, IT research and development, and multi-media industries.

Government
Pursuant to the Local government in the Philippines", the political seat of the municipal government is located at the Municipal Hall. In the History of the Philippines (1521–1898), the Gobernadorcillo was the Chief Executive who held office in the Presidencia. During the American rule (1898–1946) (History of the Philippines (1898-1946)), the elected Mayor and local officials, including the appointed ones held office at the Municipal Hall. The legislative and executive departments perform their functions in the Sangguniang Bayan (Session Hall) and Municipal Trial Court, respectively, and are located in the Town Hall.

Hermosa's Mayor is Antonio Joseph Rivera Inton, The Vice Mayor is Eigie Malana.

Sangguniang Bayan Members are: Patrick S. Rellosa, Jenna Marie Basi, Floyd Tungol, Lou Narciso, Luzviminda J. Samaniego, Regalado D. Santos Wilson M. Valencia, Christopher Vitug.

Tourism

Saint Peter of Verona Parish Church

Hermosa's cultural treasure is its 1717 heritage church.

Hermosa, known as "Llana Hermosa" belonged formerly to Orani (composed of Mabuyan and Maboco). It became an independent missionary Pueblo in 1717. In the British invasion of Manila, the Dominicans held there its provincial chapters in 1763. The Hermosa church was destroyed by fire several times. Residents of Hermosa found a boat with a statue of a saint inside it along the river.

Saint Peter of Verona, O.P. (1206 – April 6, 1252), also known as "Saint Peter Martyr", was a 13th-century Italian Catholic priest, Dominican friar and a celebrated preacher. He became the patron of this town.

The church features a baroque-style façade with stained-glasses windows. The major retablo of Hermosa is made more attractive by the variations of saints placed in it amid its dome. The church brings remembrance of the colonial past.

The Parish of Saint Peter of Verona belongs to the Roman Catholic Diocese of Balanga. Its Feast day is May 3. It is under the Vicariate of Saint Peter Verona. It is also under the Vicariate of Our Lady, Mirror of Justice (Dioecesis Balangensis), part of the Ecclesiastical Province of San Fernando, Pampanga).

Infrastructure

Telecommunications
Digitel is the major provider of telecommunication services in the municipality.

Cable TV is provided by the Hermosa Cable, Destiny and Malasimbu. Internet connection is also provided by Digitel, and Smart (SmartBro).

Electricity
Hermosa is 100% electrified and is being served by the Peninsula Electric Company (PENELCO).

A National Grid Corporation of the Philippines (NGCP) Hermosa Substation is located at Jose Abad Santos Avenue, just before entering Pampanga. It also provides power to the municipality other than Penelco through its transmission lines.

Water service
Major source of water for domestic use is ground water. Existing water systems are artesian and open wells, pumps and pipeline with tanks. Two barangays are being served by a common facility through the Local Water Utilities Administration (LWUA). In addition, a new facility was installed in barangay Mabuco, which now served the whole poblacion.

References

External links

[ Philippine Standard Geographic Code]

Municipalities of Bataan
Populated places on Manila Bay